The 2005 Harvard Crimson football team represented Harvard University in the 2005 NCAA Division I-AA football season.  Harvard finished the season with an overall record of 7–3, placing in a tie for second among Ivy league teams with a conference mark of 5–2.

Schedule

References

Harvard
Harvard Crimson football seasons
Harvard Crimson football
Harvard Crimson football